Catautira (possibly from Aymara q'atawi lime, tira cradle, "lime cradle") is a mountain in the Vilcanota mountain range in the Andes of Peru, about  high. It is situated in the Puno Region, Carabaya Province, Macusani District. Catautira lies northeast of Sumpiruni. This is where the Ninahuisa River originates. It flows along the southern slopes of Catautira before it turns to the northeast.

References

Mountains of Puno Region
Mountains of Peru